How Do You Keep the Music Playing? is an album by American pop singer Johnny Mathis that was released on May 4, 1993, by Columbia Records and included the subtitle The Songs of Michel Legrand and Alan & Marilyn Bergman on its cover. The album featured new, individual recordings of two songs that Mathis covered as a medley for his 1973 album Me and Mrs. Jones -- "I Was Born in Love with You" and "Summer Me, Winter Me". He also performed new arrangements of "The Windmills of Your Mind", "What Are You Doing the Rest of Your Life?",  and "The Summer Knows", which he had recorded for other albums many years earlier.

Liner notes
Mathis conveyed his appreciation of Legrand's music in the liner notes for the album, describing him as "the consummate composer. His arrangements are endlessly inventive and deeply passionate." His appreciation was equally enthusiastic for the Bergman's lyrics: "They express the desires of romance with a rare sophistication. It's been a delight to sing these beautiful creations."

The Bergmans also expressed their love of Legrand: "We always feel as if there are words on the lips of his notes just waiting to be written." And they were especially exuberant in their praise of Mathis: "His voice dims the lights and makes all within the sound of it feel as though he's singing just to them. The mood he creates is one of intimacy, warmth and sensitivity. And it's a voice that keeps getting better—wiser, more knowing, more moving."

Reception

Nick Catalano mentioned the album in his review of a Mathis concert in New York City. "The present album and Carnegie concerts celebrate the music of Alan and Marilyn Bergman, with arrangements by Michel Legrand. On the album, the attempt to balance the elements succeeds mightily."

Track listing
All of the songs on the album feature music by Michel Legrand and lyrics by Alan and Marilyn Bergman.

 "How Do You Keep the Music Playing?" from Best Friends (Introduction) – 1:26
 "The Summer Knows" from Summer of '42 – 4:19
 "Something New in My Life" from Micki & Maude – 4:10
 "What Are You Doing the Rest of Your Life?" from The Happy Ending – 5:58
 "The Way She Makes Me Feel" from Yentl – 4:01
 "I Was Born in Love with You" from Wuthering Heights (1970) – 4:45
 "On My Way to You" – 5:01
 "After the Rain" – 4:08
 "The Windmills of Your Mind" from The Thomas Crown Affair – 4:30
 "Summer Me, Winter Me" – 3:38
 "How Do You Keep the Music Playing?" from Best Friends – 4:42

Personnel
From the liner notes for the original album:

Performers
Johnny Mathis – vocals
Michel Legrand – piano
Michael Lang – piano
Gary Foster – alto sax; sax solo ("What Are You Doing the Rest of Your Life?") 
Dennis Budimir – guitar 
Tom Rizzo – guitar
Chuck Domanico – bass
Dave Stone – bass
Ray Brinker – drums
Arturo Sandoval – trumpet solo ("The Summer Knows")

Production
Alan and Marilyn Bergman – producer 
Jay Landers – producer 
Michel Legrand – producer, arranger, conductor
Frank Wolf – orchestra recording
Jeremy Smith – vocal recording
Joel Moss – mixing; additional recording
Malcolm Pollack – additional recording
Mike Corbett – segue editing
Maurice Cevrero – music preparation
JoAnn Kane – music preparation
Ken Watson – orchestra manager
Bino Espinoza – assistant engineer
Charlie Paakkari – assistant engineer
Ray Blair – assistant engineer
Jen Monnar – assistant engineer
Brandon Harris – assistant engineer
John Bruno – assistant engineer
Bernie Grundman – mastering engineer
Mastered at Bernie Grundman Mastering, Hollywood, California
Marsha Burns – project coordinator
Jim DiGiovanni – assistant project coordinator
Diego Uchitel – photographer
Dan McKay – hair and makeup

References

Bibliography

1993 albums
Johnny Mathis albums
Columbia Records albums
Albums recorded at Capitol Studios